Edward Raymond Andrew FRS FRSE (27 June 1921 – 27 May 2001) was a 20th-century British scientist who was a pioneer of nuclear magnetic resonance. He was a primary figure in the development and creation of the world's first MRI scanner.

Life
He was born in Boston, Lincolnshire on 27 June 1921 the only child of English parents of Scots descent. He was educated at Wellingborough School where he was head boy. He then won a place at Christ's College, Cambridge on a Natural Science Tripos from 1939 to 1942 under C. P. Snow, Lawrence Bragg, Norman Feather and David Shoenberg.

From 1942 to 1945, during the Second World War he was Scientific Officer at the Air Defence Research and Development Establishment in Malvern studying the effects of gunflashes on radar.

In 1945 he returned to Cambridge as a research student at Pembroke College and at the Cavendish Laboratory. Here he worked with David Shoenberg on superconductors, gaining a doctorate (PhD) in 1948. He then went to Harvard University for a year to work on nuclear magnetic resonance with Ed Purcell and Bersohn, also working on the Pake doublet.

He returned to Britain in 1949 to work with Jack Allen FRS at the Cavendish. Colleagues on the NMR project included Bob Eades, Dan Hyndman and Alwyn Rushworth. His students here included Waldo Hinshaw.

In March 1952 he was elected a Fellow of the Royal Society of Edinburgh.

In 1954 he became professor of physics at the University of North Wales in Bangor. Here he founded the British Radio-Frequency Spectroscopy Group (BRSG).

In 1964 he moved to a chair at the University of Nottingham in place of Prof L. F. Bates. His work here included the development of the MRI scanner from 1975 to 1977. In 1978 their success led to the development of the whole-body MRI scanner.

After 19 years in Nottingham he moved to the University of Florida in Gainesville as Graduate Professor of Radiology, Physics and Nuclear Engineering.

In 1984 he was elected a Fellow of the Royal Society of London and won their Wellcome Medal in the same year.

He died on 27 May 2001 aged 79.

Family

He was married twice: firstly to Mary with whom he had two daughters (Patricia and Charmian); and secondly in 1972 to Eunice.

Publications

Magnetic Resonance in Medicine (1984)

References

1921 births
2001 deaths
People from Boston, Lincolnshire
Alumni of the University of Cambridge
Academics of the University of Nottingham
British physicists
Fellows of the Royal Society
Fellows of the Royal Society of Edinburgh